is an asteroid, classified as near-Earth object of the Aten group that is a temporary co-orbital of Venus.

Discovery, orbit and physical properties 

 was first observed on 12 December 2012 by J. A. Johnson working for the Catalina Sky Survey. As of March 2013, it has been observed 102 times with a data-arc span of 28 days. It is an Aten asteroid and its semi-major axis of 0.72 AU is very similar to that of Venus but its eccentricity is rather large (0.4332) and its inclination of 6.7° is also significant. With an absolute magnitude of 23.4, it has a diameter of approximately 62 to 138 meters.
On 26 November 2020 it has been recovered and has now a well established orbit with an uncertainty parameter of 3.

Quasi-satellite dynamical state and orbital evolution 

Besides being a Venus co-orbital, this asteroid is also a Mercury grazer and an Earth crosser.  exhibits resonant (or near-resonant) behavior with Mercury, Venus and the Earth.

Potentially hazardous asteroid 

 was included in the Minor Planet Center list of Potentially Hazardous Asteroids (PHAs) because it comes to within 0.05 AU of Earth periodically, but it has since been removed. It will approach Earth at 0.0055 AU (and the Moon at 0.0045 AU) on 30 December 2028.

See also

Notes 

  This is assuming an albedo of 0.25–0.05.

References 
 

Further reading
 Understanding the Distribution of Near-Earth Asteroids Bottke, W. F., Jedicke, R., Morbidelli, A., Petit, J.-M., Gladman, B. 2000, Science, Vol. 288, Issue 5474, pp. 2190–2194.
 A Numerical Survey of Transient Co-orbitals of the Terrestrial Planets Christou, A. A. 2000, Icarus, Vol. 144, Issue 1, pp. 1–20.
 Debiased Orbital and Absolute Magnitude Distribution of the Near-Earth Objects Bottke, W. F., Morbidelli, A., Jedicke, R., Petit, J.-M., Levison, H. F., Michel, P., Metcalfe, T. S. 2002, Icarus, Vol. 156, Issue 2, pp. 399–433.
 Transient co-orbital asteroids Brasser, R., Innanen, K. A., Connors, M., Veillet, C., Wiegert, P., Mikkola, S., Chodas, P. W. 2004, Icarus, Vol. 171, Issue 1, pp. 102–109. 
 The population of Near Earth Asteroids in coorbital motion with Venus Morais, M. H. M., Morbidelli, A. 2006, Icarus, Vol. 185, Issue 1, pp. 29–38. 
 Asteroid 2012 XE133: a transient companion to Venus de la Fuente Marcos, C., de la Fuente Marcos, R.  2013, Monthly Notices of the Royal Astronomical Society, Vol. 432, Issue 2, pp. 886–893.
 AstDys-2 on 2012 XE133 Retrieved 2013-02-20

External links 
  data at MPC
 List of Potentially Hazardous Asteroids (PHAs)
 
 
 

Minor planet object articles (unnumbered)
Discoveries by the Catalina Sky Survey
Venus-crossing asteroids
Earth-crossing asteroids
Venus co-orbital minor planets
20121212